The 2007 NCAA Division III women's basketball tournament was the 26th annual tournament hosted by the NCAA to determine the national champion of Division III women's collegiate basketball in the United States.

DePauw defeated Washington University in St. Louis in the championship game, 55–52, to claim the Tigers' first Division III national title.

The championship rounds were hosted by Springfield College in Springfield, Massachusetts.

Bracket

Final Four

All-tournament team
 Liz Bondi, DePauw
 Suzy Doughty, DePauw
 Debbie Bruen, Mary Washington
 Jaimie McFarlin, Washington University in St. Louis
 Stephanie Ryba, NYU

See also
 2007 NCAA Division I women's basketball tournament
 2007 NCAA Division II women's basketball tournament
 2007 NAIA Division I women's basketball tournament
 2007 NAIA Division II women's basketball tournament
 2007 NCAA Division III men's basketball tournament

References

 
NCAA Division III women's basketball tournament
2007 in sports in Massachusetts
Washington University Bears
DePauw Tigers